Yusupov Palace may refer to:

Moika Palace, also known as Yusupov Palace (Russian: Дворец Юсуповых на Мойке, literally the Palace of the Yusupovs on the Moika), once the primary residence in St. Petersburg, Russia of the House of Yusupov
Yusupov Palace (Crimea), in Koreiz, in the Yalta region of Crimea